The Group 3A West Region is a division of the Virginia High School League. The region was formed in 2013 when the VHSL adopted a six classification format and eliminated the previous three classification system. For the purpose of regular season competition, schools may compete within districts that existed prior to 2013, while post-season competition will be organized within four conferences that make up each region.

Current Conference Alignment

Conference 29
Broadway High School of Broadway, Virginia
Fluvanna County High School of Palmyra, Virginia
Fort Defiance High School of Fort Defiance, Virginia
Monticello High School of Charlottesville, Virginia
Spotswood High School of Penn Laird, Virginia
Turner Ashby High School of Bridgewater, Virginia
Waynesboro High School of Waynesboro, Virginia

Conference 30
Brookville High School of Lynchburg, Virginia
Heritage High School of Lynchburg, Virginia
Liberty High School of Bedford, Virginia
Rustburg High School of Rustburg, Virginia
Tunstall High School of Dry Fork, Virginia

Conference 31
Alleghany High School of Covington, Virginia
Lord Botetourt High School of Daleville, Virginia
Magna Vista High School of Ridgeway, Virginia
Northside High School of Roanoke, Virginia
Rockbridge County High School of Lexington, Virginia
Staunton River High School of Moneta, Virginia

Conference 32
Abingdon High School of Abingdon, Virginia
Blacksburg High School of Blacksburg, Virginia
Cave Spring High School of Roanoke, Virginia
Christiansburg High School of Christiansburg, Virginia
Hidden Valley High School of Roanoke, Virginia
Patrick County High School of Stuart, Virginia

External links
 Virginia High School League

References

Virginia High School League
High school sports in Virginia